Jacob Carl Noll (born March 8, 1994) is an American professional baseball infielder for the Washington Nationals organization. He has played in Major League Baseball (MLB) with the Nationals.

Career

College
Noll did not receive a Division I baseball scholarship out of Charlotte High School in Punta Gorda, Florida, where he hit just one home run during his playing career. He was accepted onto the Eagles baseball team at Florida Gulf Coast University as a walk-on player in 2014. That year, he was named the Louisville Slugger National Freshman of the Year, among other honors. He played for the Lakeshore Chinooks in the collegiate summer baseball Northwoods League in 2014, contributing to their championship drive. In 2015, he played collegiate summer baseball with the Hyannis Harbor Hawks of the Cape Cod Baseball League, where he was named a league all-star. In 2016, he was named the ASUN Conference Player of the Year.

Professional
The Nationals selected Noll in the seventh round of the 2016 Major League Baseball draft, making him the fifth-highest draft pick in Florida Gulf Coast history and the second-highest among position players. Many prognosticators had expected him to be drafted a round or two higher. Noll chose to sign with the Nationals and was named among the organization's Minor League Baseball All-Stars at the end of the 2016 season, progressing from the Class A Short Season Auburn Doubledays up to the Class A Full Season Hagerstown Suns over the course of his campaign. Noll continued his development in 2017, ending the year with the Class A-Advanced Potomac Nationals. Noll was one of six Potomac Nationals honored as Carolina League All-Stars in 2018. He played for the Salt River Rafters in the Arizona Fall League following the 2018 season.

Primarily a second baseman in 2016 and 2017, Noll played mostly corner infield positions in 2018. After the 2018 season, MLB Pipeline ranked him as the Nationals' 31st-best prospect; in April 2019, he moved to 27th on the list.

Noll received a non-roster invitation to major league spring training in the 2019 preseason. A strong spring performance saw him stand alone as the last non-roster player in major league camp by the final day of spring action in Florida. After fellow infielder Adrián Sánchez was optioned to the Class-AAA Fresno Grizzlies following the final spring training game, the Nationals selected Noll's contract and promoted him to the roster for Opening Day.

Noll made his debut as a pinch-hitter against the New York Mets on March 30, 2019, grounding out on a high chopper. In his third major league at-bat, on April 3, he worked a bases-loaded walk against Philadelphia Phillies reliever David Robertson for a walkoff win in the ninth inning.

On April 24, 2019, Noll started his first major league game against the Colorado Rockies at Coors Field.  He recorded his first major league hit the same day, an RBI double off of Rockies pitcher German Marquez. In 8 games with the Nationals, Noll had a .167 average and 2 RBI. The Nationals finished the 2019 year 93-69, clinching a wild card spot, and eventually winning the World Series over the Houston Astros. Noll was not part of the postseason run, but still won his first world championship.

In 2020, Noll began the season at the alternate training site, but was promoted in late September and finished the season with a slash line of .353/.353/.412 in 17 at-bats, notching 6 hits and no RBI. On March 27, 2021, Noll was designated for assignment by the Nationals. He was outrighted to the minors on March 30.

References

External links

1994 births
Living people
People from Punta Gorda, Florida
Baseball players from Florida
Major League Baseball infielders
Washington Nationals players
Florida Gulf Coast Eagles baseball players
Gulf Coast Nationals players
Auburn Doubledays players
Hagerstown Suns players
Potomac Nationals players
Harrisburg Senators players
Fresno Grizzlies players
Rochester Red Wings players
Salt River Rafters players
Hyannis Harbor Hawks players
Lakeshore Chinooks players